3 Idiots is a Pakistani television series that airs on Aaj TV on Saturdays at 8 pm. Waseem Abbas plays an ordinary office employee, Sabir, and Iftikhar Thakur personates an uneducated villager. On 10 March 2012, Aaj TV canceled the show.

Concept
3 Idiots is a satire show that parodies the political system of Pakistan. The paradox of the show is aimed towards the ‘idiots’ who talk about social issues and are correct. Waseem Abbas mostly begins the program by humoring the democracy. Every episode highlights one single aspect of our social system and evaluates errors versus the un-tapped possibilities with biting wit on Pakistan's problems. The show is arranged at a common man’s café (dhaba).

Similar shows
3 Idiots is similar to GEO TV's Khabarnaak and Dunya TV's Hasb-e-Haal.

Cancellation
The Aaj TV administration canceled 3 Idiots after airing its last episode on 10 March 2012. Poor ratings and lack of retention of key staff members was the reason for cancellation.

References

External links 
 Watch 3 Idiots Online 

Urdu-language television shows
Pakistani comedy television series
Urdu comedy shows